Tayo Oviosu is the Founder and Group CEO of Paga, a mobile payments company that is focused on digitizing cash in emerging economies. Nigeria is Paga's first market. He is a graduate of Electrical Engineering from the University of Southern California and also has a master's degree in Business Administration from the Graduate School of Business, Stanford University.
Tayo Oviosu has a passion to help entrepreneurs bring ideas to life and build scalable businesses. This passion is what led to co-founding Kairos Angels.

Education 
Oviosu is a graduate of Electrical and Electronics Engineering from the University of Southern California. He also has a master's degree in Business Administration from the Graduate School of Business, Stanford University in 2005.

Career 
After graduating from USC, Oviosu started his career at Biomorphic VLSI as a Semiconductor Chip Design Engineer and then Event 411 as a Software Engineer all based in Los Angeles California. He later went to work for Deloitte Consulting in the CRM and Technology practice as a Senior Consultant. After business school he joined Cisco Systems in San Jose California where he was responsible for strategy, acquisitions and private equity investments in a few segments and helped lead Cisco's investment expansion in Africa with investment opportunities. He led investments and acquisitions which include the $130m acquisition of Reactivity and investment in Guardium (Database Security, Series C, sold to IBM). In 2008, he  returned to Nigeria where he joined Travant Capital Partners and served as vice president. In 2009, he founded Paga to address the use of cash and expand financial access.

Personal life 
He married Affiong Williams in 2014.

References 

Living people
Web developers
Nigerian technology businesspeople
Yoruba businesspeople
21st-century Nigerian businesspeople
Nigerian company founders
Stanford Graduate School of Business alumni
1978 births